The National Skills Academy for Power is a skills academy for the energy and power industry in the UK.

History
The National Skills Academy for Power (NSAP) was first announced in October 2008 by the Department for Innovation, Universities and Skills. Steve K Davies was made the Chief Executive in September 2009. It was given formal government approval on 18 March 2010.

It was the 15th National Skills Academy. £2.9 million of funding for the project was allocated from the government. The Skills Academy was match funded by the energy and utility sector. Within 2.5 years NSAP became financially independent and continues to operate under the umbrella of the Sector Skills Council, Energy and Utility Skills

NSAP held its first Annual Conference and Awards Dinner on 9 March 2011 at Twickenham Stadium hosted by Sir Clive Woodward. This also included the inaugural "People in Power Awards".

Structure
It is based near Monkspath on the A34.

It is a partnership between the Sector Skills Council, Energy and Utility Skills, and several energy companies:
 Alstom
 Morrison Utility Services  (based in Stevenage)
 E.ON UK
 Scottish Power
 CE Electric UK
 Carillion Utility Services
 National Grid plc
 EDF Energy
 ABB Group
 Balfour Beatty Utility Solutions
 Scottish and Southern Energy 
 Morgan Sindall 
 ITI Energy

It also works in conjunction with the IET Power Academy, which was set up in 2004, an industry group that was formed by seven universities (Bath, Cardiff, Imperial College London, Manchester, Queen's University Belfast, Southampton and Strathclyde) and eighteen power companies.

Function
It seeks to focus and coordinate UK-wide training in the power sector by standardising training materials. It also promotes the industry sector, specifically its career choices, in a way similar to a trade association. Similar work, on a much broader focus, is carried out by the Institution of Engineering and Technology (IET).

See also
 Association of Electricity Producers - trade association
 Renewable Energy Association
 Renewable energy in the United Kingdom
 Energy in the United Kingdom
 Lists of power stations in the United Kingdom
 NSAP address

References

External links
 NSAP

Companies based in Solihull
Education in Solihull
Educational institutions established in 2010
Electric power in the United Kingdom
Electrical trades organizations
Energy education
Energy organizations
Engineering education in the United Kingdom
Natural gas industry in the United Kingdom
Universities and colleges in England
2010 establishments in the United Kingdom